Todd Olivas (born August 17, 1971), who goes by the stage name ToddZero, formerly, Todd 0, is a Christian musician, who primarily plays a contemporary Christian style of electronica music. His first studio album, Kid Heart, was released in 2013.

Early life
Todd  Olivias was born on August 17, 1971.

Music career
His music recording career began in 2012, with the extended play, 1234567, that was independently released. He released, Kid Heart, a studio album, on June 4, 2013, with Hembot Recordings.
 His song "We Will Win" has appeared on the ABC Family network. And is also the hockey highlights theme song for Los Angeles news station KTLA.

Discography
Studio albums
 My Precious Limp (August 17, 2016, Hembot Recordings)
 Kid Heart (June 4, 2013, Hembot Recordings)
EPs
 "Kid Heart - Bonus EP" (November 1, 2013)
 1234567 (May 1, 2012, as Todd 0)
Singles
 Dear World (January 1, 2015)

Discography

References

External links
 Official website

1971 births
Living people
Musicians from Los Angeles
Songwriters from California